Agana may refer to:

People 
 Tessie Agana (born 1942), Filipino child star during the 1950s
 Tony Agana (born 1963), English former professional footballer

Other uses
 Hagåtña, Guam, formally known in English as Agana
 Agana race riot, took place at Agana, Guam (now Hagåtña) over the two nights of 24–25 December 1944
 Agana Heights, a village in Hagåtña, Guam
 Agana Historic District, in Hagåtña, Guam is a 2-acre (0.81 ha) historic district
 Agana Shopping Center, a shopping center located in downtown Hagåtña, Guam
 Agana Spanish Bridge, a stone arch bridge built in 1800 in Hagåtña, Guam (formerly known as Agana)
 Agana Airfield, another name for Antonio B. Won Pat International Airport in Hagåtña, Guam